Otod Islets are two uninhabited islets in the province of Romblon in the Philippines.  It is geographically part of barangay Li-o located east of Romblon Island and jotting Otod Point in the Sibuyan Sea.

See also

 List of islands of the Philippines
 List of islands
 Desert island

Islands of Romblon
Uninhabited islands of the Philippines